John Mugabi (born March 4, 1960) is a Ugandan former professional boxer who competed from 1980 to 1991, and 1996 to 1999. He held the WBC super-welterweight title from 1989 to 1990, and challenged twice for world titles at middleweight, including the undisputed championship.

Mugabi was part of an exceptionally talented group of light-middleweights and middleweights during a "golden era" of the 1980s which included Marvin Hagler, Sugar Ray Leonard, Thomas Hearns, Wilfred Benítez, Davey Moore, and Roberto Durán. As an amateur, Mugabi won a silver medal in the welterweight division at the 1980 Summer Olympics, and was the only medallist for Uganda at the event. He is listed #38 on Ring Magazine's list of 100 greatest punchers of all time

Amateur career 
Representing Uganda, Mugabi was the Silver medalist at the 1980 Olympic Games in Moscow, boxing in the Welterweight class. Mugabi lost to Andrés Aldama of Cuba in the final.

He was also a silver medallist at the 1976 Junior World Championships, losing to Herol Graham in the final. Additionally, Mugabi won a bronze medal at the 1978 All-Africa Games in the light-welterweight division.

Highlights 

 1976 Junior World Championships
Finals: Lost to Herol Graham (United Kingdom)
World Championships (63,5 kg), Belgrade, Yugoslavia, May 1978:
1/16: Defeated Esko Pallaspuro (Finland) RSC 2
1/8: Lost to Jean-Claude Ruiz (France) by walkover
 All-Africa Games, Algiers, Algeria, July 1978:
 (no data available)
 Golden Boat Tournament (67 kg), Łódź, Poland, February 1979:
Finals: Lost to Grigoriy Lapshin (Soviet Union) by unanimous decision, 0–5

 TSC Tournament (67 kg), East Berlin, East Germany, October 1979:
1/4: Defeated Siegfried Vogelreuter (East Germany) RSC 2
1/2: Lost to Ionel Budusan (Romania)
 Olympic Games (67 kg), Moscow, Soviet Union, July-August 1980:
1/16: Defeated Georges Koffi (Congo) KO 1
1/8: Defeated Paul Rasamimanana (Madagascar) KO 2
1/4: Defeated Mehmet Bogujevci (Yugoslavia) KO 1
1/2: Defeated Kazimierz Szczerba (Poland) by split decision, 3–2
Finals: Lost to Andrés Aldama (Cuba) by majority decision, 1–4

Duals 
Uganda–Poland Duals (63,5 kg), Kampala, Uganda, January 1978: Lost to Bogdan Gajda PTS
Uganda–GDR Duals (67 kg), Schwerin, East Germany, February 1979: Lost to Jochen Bachfeld PTS
Uganda–Poland Duals (67 kg), Warsaw, Poland, February 1979: Lost to Piotr Bobrowski 1–2

Professional career 

John Mugabi started as a professional on December 5, 1980, by knocking out Oemer Karadenis in round one in Cologne. Soon after that win, Mugabi moved to London where he became acquainted with boxing promoter Mickey Duff, an expert in boxer marketing who landed Mugabi various fights in England and built his reputation there. Mugabi won eight fights in Europe. Searching for more formidable foes, John moved to Florida where he became a favourite of American TV networks with his sensational knockouts of contenders such as Curtis Ramsey, Gary Guiden, former world champion Eddie Gazo, Curtis Parker, Frank The Animal Fletcher, Nino Gonzalez and Earl Hargrove through a display of tenacity and ferociousness.'The Beast’ as he would become known (for his ferocious attacks and untamable style—bashing his prey with overhand rights and wild left hooks) was able to fluctuate his weight between middleweight and junior middleweight. Some people lose effectiveness by changing weight classes, but not Mugabi. He was able to knock out every opponent he faced to that point of his career.

Mugabi’s first victory of note came on May 2, 1982, when he took on veteran Curtis Ramsey. It was Mugabi’s 11th bout and he took care of the American in two rounds in Atlantic City, New Jersey. 1983 was a busy calendar year for the Beast. In that year he took on Gary Guiden, who had just come off of a Championship fight against Davey Moore; Mugabi stopped him in three. Many started speculating about Mugabi’s role in the future of the Junior Middleweight and Middleweight divisions. The fact Mugabi easily made the weight at both divisions made him more intriguing than most prospects. Nicaraguan, Eddie Gazo, a former WBA Junior Middleweight Champion provided Mugabi with his first real test. Gazo went rounds with Mugabi, but ‘The Beast’ ended things the way he always did. Mugabi was simply stronger and faster tactically overwhelming the busier Gazo. In the same year, Mugabi took on Curtis Parker (a former Pennsylvania Golden Gloves amateur champion )The ‘meeting’ with Curtis Parker was on national television. Parker was an established fighter, but Mugabi’s destruction of Parker was savage. It was the first time that Parker had lost a bout by knockout.

In February 1984 Mugabi’s ability to take adversity was tested by James ‘Hard Rock’ Green. Mugabi slowly took control of the fight until it was stopped in the 10th round, with Mugabi declared the winner by technical knockout. The bout between ‘The Beast’ and Frank ‘The Animal’ Fletcher marked a quiet maturity that marked Mugabi’s transformation from being what had been dubbed a ‘banger’ with raw power to a refined tactical boxer. The Beast hurt his prey, gently testing with his jabs and then in the 4th round a couple of roundhouse punches and a haymaker travelling all the way from his waist caught Fletcher asleep—the fight ended with Fletcher’s body between the ropes.

On his way to becoming the number one contender for the middleweight title of each of the three major sanctioning bodies (WBA, WBC, and IBF), Mugabi ran roughshod over the division and finished each of his opponents inside the distance. Mugabi's ferocity was captured by Phil Berger. Writing in the New York Times in 1986, Berger, commenting on Mugabi’s preparation for the Hagler fight noted the intensity of preparation that left his sparring partners in a 'woebegone condition' and further that some did not last long enough to draw their second paycheck and left Mugabi’s training camp ‘looking like extras from 'Night of the Living Dead'.

Because of his ability to fight both at junior middleweight and middleweight, fans began to talk about the possibility of him challenging either world light middleweight champion Hearns or world middleweight champion Hagler. Despite Mugabi being a mandatory contender for some time,  a Hearns - Mugabi title match never materialised, as Hearns elected to move to Middleweight to challenge Marvelous Marvin Hagler. Considering his streak and Hagler's tough battle with Hearns on April 15, 1985, some felt Mugabi had a shot at doing what eleven men before him could not: wresting Hagler's undisputed world middleweight title from him. On March 10, 1986, Marvin ‘Marvelous’ Hagler rose to a very stiff challenge. A young, undefeated powerhouse was destroying every opponent in his path. John ‘The Beast’ Mugabi had won all of his contests by knockout—many spectacular; many in the first few rounds of the fight. He possessed incredible knockout power and provided the boxing world with an epic encounter.
 
The fight was the first televised by Showtime. Mugabi landed his share of blows to Hagler's head during the early rounds. The turning point came in the sixth round when Hagler landed many heavy blows and staggered Mugabi. Mugabi fought back gamely but his early knockout wins left him ill-prepared for a long, tough fight. In the end, it was Hagler who came out the victor, with a knockout in the eleventh round. Many boxing fans consider this to have been the toughest contest of Hagler's career.  Sugar Ray Leonard's decision to come out of retirement and challenge Hagler for the Middleweight Championship was heavily influenced by Hagler's performance in the Mugabi fight.

After his first loss, Mugabi retired to Uganda and ballooned in weight to 190  lbs. In September 1986 he contacted Mickey Duff, stating that he was ready to fight again. Mugabi went down in weight and was given an opportunity by the WBC to win their world light middleweight title, vacated by Hearns. Once again many fans favoured him, this time against Duane Thomas, on December 5 of '86. However, Mugabi suffered a broken eye socket, the consequence of a punch in round three and the fight had to be stopped. Mugabi underwent optical surgery the next day to repair his injury.

Discouraged by two consecutive losses, Mugabi gained weight and did not fight for nearly fourteen months. In January 1988, he came back to fight Bryan Grant on the undercard of Mike Tyson's title defence against Larry Holmes. Mugabi won by quick knockout and set off on another knockout winning streak. He became number one contender for the WBC 154  lb title in August 1988 but could not land a fight with then-champion Donald Curry. After Curry lost his title in an upset in early 1989, Mugabi was given another opportunity to become world champion by the WBC.  On July 8 of that year, Mugabi finally made his dream come true, when Curry's successor Rene Jacquot could not continue the fight due to an injury in round one in Grenoble to become the WBC light middleweight champion. After two first-round knockout wins against Ricky Stackhouse and Carlos Antunes, Mugabi, who by this time was having difficulty making the weight limit of 154  lbs, put his title on the line against Terry Norris. When Norris downed the champion for the count with a right to the jaw, Mugabi received the dubious distinction as the second fighter, after Al Singer, to both win and lose a world title by the first-round knockout when he was defeated by Norris. Showing resilience, Mugabi resurfaced with two more wins and once again found himself fighting for a world title, facing Gerald McClellan on November 20, 1991, in London for the vacant WBO middleweight championship. Mugabi looked a shadow of his former self by this time, and once again came out on the losing end, again by a first-round knockout.

Mugabi took a five-year layoff in which he moved to Australia. In 1996, he came back for the first of an eight-fight comeback. He went on to claim the Australian middleweight championship by way of a 12th-round decision over Jamie Wallace. It only took John two fights before he was in line for a world title again. In his third fight back from the loss to Norris, Mugabi would challenge Glen Kelly. That November night in 1999, marked the decline of Mugabi’s illustrious boxing career as he was again knocked out in the eighth round. Mugabi resides in Australia where among other functions he trains fighters.

When Mugabi finally retired, he had a record of 42 wins, 7 losses and 1 draw, 39 wins by knockout. His 25 fight knockout win streak stands as one of the longest knockout streaks ever in boxing.

Life after boxing
Currently, Mugabi is working on his biography as well as a documentary. The themes of the project revolve around three spectrums: his journey, his glory and his determination to advocate the welfare of elite boxers. His biggest single concern is the need for emerging boxing talent to have a training program that goes beyond the gym to encompass learning a trade/profession as they pursue their dreams of boxing glory. After all, a boxer at any time can lose their livelihood through a single punch or training accident with no fall back—no pension, no savings, no nothing. He has started his advocacy with himself. Mugabi is currently a student determined to gain what he may have lost in an illustrious boxing career-fulfilment outside the ring.

Mugabi has a 20-year-old daughter, Mildred Prudence Mugabi who lives in Tampa, Florida and he has another daughter who still resides in Kampala, Uganda named Mourine Basemera Mugabi.

Professional boxing record

References

1960 births
Sportspeople from Kampala
Boxers at the 1980 Summer Olympics
Living people
Welterweight boxers
Olympic boxers of Uganda
Olympic silver medalists for Uganda
World boxing champions
Olympic medalists in boxing
Ugandan male boxers
Medalists at the 1980 Summer Olympics
African Games bronze medalists for Uganda
African Games medalists in boxing
Middleweight boxers
Super-middleweight boxers
Light-heavyweight boxers
World Boxing Council champions
World light-middleweight boxing champions
Light-welterweight boxers
Competitors at the 1978 All-Africa Games